Molly McDonald (born 4 May 2001) is an Australian rules footballer who plays for St Kilda in the AFL Women's (AFLW).

References

External links

 

Living people
2001 births
Dandenong Stingrays players (NAB League Girls)
St Kilda Football Club (AFLW) players
Australian rules footballers from Victoria (Australia)
Sportswomen from Victoria (Australia)